D63  may refer to:
 INS Kolkata (D63), an active Indian guided missile destroyer of Kolkata class
 HMS Verity (D63), a Biitish Royal Navy Second World War Convoy Defence ship
 Greek destroyer Navarinon (D63), a Greek Navy ship transferred on 27 September 1962
 Greek destroyer Niki (D63), a Greek Navy ship
 Spanish destroyer Mendez Nunez (D63), a Spanish Navy ship transferred on 17 May 1978
 Dinsmore Airport (California) FAA LID
 a road in Dubai